The 2016–17 UNLV Runnin' Rebels basketball team represented the University of Nevada, Las Vegas during the 2016–17 NCAA Division I men's basketball season. The Runnin' Rebels were led by first-year head coach Marvin Menzies. They played their home games at the Thomas & Mack Center in Paradise, Nevada as members of the Mountain West Conference. They finished the season 11–21, 4–14 in Mountain West play to finish in a tie for tenth place. They lost in the first round of the Mountain West tournament to San Diego State.

Previous season
The 2015–16 Runnin' Rebels finished the 2015–16 season 18–15, 8–10 in Mountain West play to finish in a tie for sixth place. They defeated Air Force to advance to the quarterfinals of the Mountain West tournament where they lost to Fresno State.

On January 10, 2016, UNLV announced that head coach Dave Rice and the school had mutually agreed for him to step down as head coach. Associate head coach Todd Simon was named interim head coach for the remainder of the season. On March 28, the school announced that Chris Beard had been hired as head coach. However, less than three weeks later, Beard left UNLV to accept the head coaching position at Texas Tech. On April 16, the school hired Mavin Menzies as head coach.

Departures

Incoming transfers

2016 recruiting class

Roster

Schedule and results

|-
!colspan=9 style=| Exhibition

|-
!colspan=9 style=| Non-conference regular season

|-
!colspan=9 style=| Mountain West regular season

|-
!colspan=9 style=| Mountain West tournament

References

UNLV
UNLV Runnin' Rebels basketball seasons
Run
Run